This is a list of 360 species in Oecetis, a genus of long-horned caddisflies in the family Leptoceridae.

Oecetis species

 Oecetis abhinagupta Schmid, 1995 i c g
 Oecetis absimilis Kimmins, 1962 i c g
 Oecetis accola Neboiss, 1989 i c g
 Oecetis acuminata Kimmins, 1962 i c g
 Oecetis acuta Ulmer, 1931 i c g
 Oecetis adanis Kobayashi, 1987 i c g
 Oecetis adelaidica Wells, 2000 i c g
 Oecetis aeoloptera Kimmins in Mosely & Kimmins, 1953 i c g
 Oecetis aequatorialis Marlier, 1958 i c g
 Oecetis afra Mosely, 1934 i c g
 Oecetis africana Kimmins, 1957 i c g
 Oecetis aganda Mosely, 1936 i c g
 Oecetis akimi Gibbs, 1973 i c g
 Oecetis albescens Mosely, 1930 i c g
 Oecetis albicornis Martin, 1931 i c g
 Oecetis albopunctata (Lestage, 1919) i c g
 Oecetis alexanderi Kumanski in Kumanski & Malicky, 1976 i c g
 Oecetis alticolaria Mey, 1998 i c g
 Oecetis amazonica (Banks, 1924) i c g
 Oecetis ancylocerca Yang & Morse, 2000 i c g
 Oecetis angelae  g
 Oecetis angirasa Schmid, 1995 i c g
 Oecetis angulata Kimmins, 1963 i c g
 Oecetis angusta (Banks, 1920) i c
 Oecetis angustipennis (Martynov, 1936) i c g
 Oecetis aniruddha Schmid, 1995 i c g
 Oecetis anomala Marlier, 1943 i c g
 Oecetis antennata (Martynov, 1935) i c g
 Oecetis apicipennis (Banks, 1913) i c g
 Oecetis appendiculata Ulmer, 1923 i c g
 Oecetis arawana Neboiss, 1989 i c g
 Oecetis arcada Mosely in Mosely & Kimmins, 1953 i c g
 Oecetis arctipennis Kimmins, 1962 i c g
 Oecetis arizonica Denning, 1951 i c g
 Oecetis asciata Gibbs, 1973 i c g
 Oecetis asmada Malicky, 1979 i c g
 Oecetis asmanista Mosely in Mosely & Kimmins, 1953 i c g
 Oecetis assamensis Kimmins, 1963 i c g
 Oecetis asymmetrica Kimmins, 1962 i c g
 Oecetis atarpa Mosely in Mosely & Kimmins, 1953 i c g
 Oecetis atpomarus Malicky, 1992 i c g
 Oecetis australis (Banks, 1920) i c g
 Oecetis avara (Banks, 1895) i c g
 Oecetis barbarae Neboiss, 1989 i c g
 Oecetis belihuloya Malicky, 1973 i c g
 Oecetis bellula Yang & Morse, 2000 i c g
 Oecetis bengalica Martynov, 1936 i c g
 Oecetis berneri Kimmins, 1957 i c g
 Oecetis bhairava Schmid, 1995 i c g
 Oecetis bhavabhuti Schmid, 1995 i c g
 Oecetis bicaudata Navás, 1931 i c g
 Oecetis bicuspida Gibbs, 1973 i c g
 Oecetis bilobosa Flint, 1974 i c g
 Oecetis biramosa Martynov, 1936 i c g
 Oecetis blythi Wells, 2000 i c g
 Oecetis brachyura Yang & Morse, 1997 i c g
 Oecetis brevis Kimmins, 1963 i c g
 Oecetis brignolii Malicky, 1981 i c g
 Oecetis brunnescens (Ulmer, 1923) i c g
 Oecetis buitenzorgensis Ulmer, 1951 i c g
 Oecetis bullata Yang & Morse, 1997 i c g
 Oecetis burtoni Neboiss, 1978 i c g
 Oecetis caelum Chen & Morce, 1992 g
 Oecetis canariensis Brauer, 1900 i c g
 Oecetis carlibanezae  g
 Oecetis carvalhoi Marlier, 1965 i c g
 Oecetis catenulata Neboiss, 1989 i c g
 Oecetis caucula Yang & Morse, 2000 i c g
 Oecetis caudata Navás, 1936 i c g
 Oecetis ceylanica (Ulmer, 1915) i c g
 Oecetis chathamensis Tillyard, 1925 i c g
 Oecetis chipiriri  g
 Oecetis cinerascens (Hagen, 1861) i c g b
 Oecetis circinata Gibbs, 1973 i c g
 Oecetis claggi Banks, 1937 i c g
 Oecetis clavata Yang & Morse, 2000 i c g
 Oecetis cochleata Marlier, 1956 i c g
 Oecetis cohaesa Mey, 1998 i c g
 Oecetis comalis Yang & Morse, 2000 i c g
 Oecetis complex Hwang, 1957 i c g
 Oecetis complexa Kimmins in Mosely & Kimmins, 1953 i c g
 Oecetis connata Flint, 1974 i c g
 Oecetis coomana Navás, 1932 i c g
 Oecetis cornuata Yang & Morse, 2000 i c g
 Oecetis crassicornis Ulmer, 1930 i c g
 Oecetis cristata Kimmins, 1963 i c g
 Oecetis cymula Neboiss, 1982 i c g
 Oecetis cyrtocercis Yang & Morse, 2000 i c g
 Oecetis dakchineswara Schmid, 1995 i c g
 Oecetis danielae  g
 Oecetis daytona Ross, 1947 i c g
 Oecetis decora Kimmins, 1957 i c g
 Oecetis desaegeri Jacquemart, 1967 i c g
 Oecetis devakiputra Schmid, 1995 i c g
 Oecetis dhatusena Schmid, 1958 i c g
 Oecetis diclava Mey, 1998 i c g
 Oecetis dilata Yang & Morse, 2000 i c g
 Oecetis disjuncta (Banks, 1920) i c g
 Oecetis ditissa Ross, 1966 i c g
 Oecetis doesburgi Flint, 1974 i c g
 Oecetis dominguezi Rueda Martin & al., 2011 g
 Oecetis dvichakha Schmid, 1975 i c g
 Oecetis eburnea Schmid, 1961 i c g
 Oecetis eddlestoni Ross, 1938 i c g
 Oecetis elata Denning & Sykora, 1966 i c g
 Oecetis elouardi Gibon & Randriamasimanana in Randriamasimanana & Gibon, 1998 i c g
 Oecetis empusa Malicky & Chaibu in Malicky, 2000 i c g
 Oecetis epekeina Neboiss, 1989 i c g
 Oecetis evigra Chen & Morce, 1992 g
 Oecetis excisa Ulmer, 1907 i c g
 Oecetis fahieni Schmid, 1958 i c g
 Oecetis falicia Denning in Denning & Sykora, 1966 i c g
 Oecetis fasciata Lestage, 1919 i c g
 Oecetis fimbriata Navás, 1935 i c g
 Oecetis flavicoma Mey, 1998 i c g
 Oecetis fletcheri Kimmins, 1963 i c g
 Oecetis floridanus (Banks, 1905) i c
 Oecetis forcipata Kimmins, 1961 i c g
 Oecetis furva (Rambur, 1842) i c g
 Oecetis fuscata Kimmins, 1956 i c g
 Oecetis georgia Ross, 1941 i c g
 Oecetis ghibensis Kimmins, 1963 i c g
 Oecetis glebula Wells, 2000 i c g
 Oecetis goodmani Randriamasimanana & Gibon, 1998 i c g
 Oecetis goraknata Schmid, 1995 i c g
 Oecetis gradata Ulmer, 1923 i c g
 Oecetis granulosa Jacquemart, 1961 i c g
 Oecetis graphata Mey, 1998 i c g
 Oecetis grazalemae Gonzalez & Iglesias, 1989 i c g
 Oecetis guamana (Fischer, 1970) i c g
 Oecetis gunapatya Schmid, 1995 i c g
 Oecetis hamata (Ulmer, 1915) i c g
 Oecetis hamochiensis Kobayashi, 1984 i c g
 Oecetis harivamsa Schmid, 1995 i c g
 Oecetis hayagriva Schmid, 1995 i c g
 Oecetis hemerobioides (McLachlan, 1866) i c g
 Oecetis hertui Randriamasimanana & Gibon, 1999 i c g
 Oecetis hiranyakachipu Schmid, 1995 i c g
 Oecetis hiranyaksa Schmid, 1995 i c g
 Oecetis hoelzeli Malicky, 1983 i c g
 Oecetis hulstaerti Navás, 1931 i c g
 Oecetis iara  g
 Oecetis ichtadevata Schmid, 1995 i c g
 Oecetis ichtadvaraka Schmid, 1995 i c g
 Oecetis ichtasurama Schmid, 1995 i c g
 Oecetis ichvara Schmid, 1995 i c g
 Oecetis iguazu Flint, 1983 i c g
 Oecetis immobilis (Hagen, 1861) i c g
 Oecetis inconspicua (Walker, 1852) i c g b
 Oecetis indivisa (Martynov, 1936) i c g
 Oecetis inflata Flint, 1974 i c g
 Oecetis inscripta Kimmins in Mosely & Kimmins, 1953 i c g
 Oecetis insignis (Banks, 1911) i c g
 Oecetis insymmetrica Mey, 1998 i c g
 Oecetis intima McLachlan, 1877 i c g
 Oecetis intramontana Mey, 1998 i c g
 Oecetis iti McFarlane, 1964 i c g
 Oecetis jacobsoni Ulmer, 1930 i c g
 Oecetis janseni Navás, 1931 i c g
 Oecetis jasikana Gibbs, 1973 i c g
 Oecetis jayadeva Schmid, 1995 i c g
 Oecetis kagerana (Kimmins, 1956) i c g
 Oecetis kakaduensis Neboiss, 1989 i c g
 Oecetis kalidasa Schmid, 1995 i c g
 Oecetis kalyuga Schmid, 1995 i c g
 Oecetis kambaitensis Kimmins, 1963 i c g
 Oecetis kartavirya Schmid, 1995 i c g
 Oecetis karttikeya Schmid, 1995 i c g
 Oecetis kasenyii Jacquemart, 1959 i c g
 Oecetis kathia Mosely, 1939 i c g
 Oecetis keraia Neboiss, 1989 i c g
 Oecetis kimminsi Kumanski, 1979 i c g
 Oecetis knutsoni Flint, 1981 i c g
 Oecetis kolobota Neboiss, 1989 i c g
 Oecetis koyana Kimmins, 1955 i c g
 Oecetis kpanduna Gibbs, 1973 i c g
 Oecetis kulasekhara Schmid, 1995 i c g
 Oecetis kunenensis Barnard, 1934 i c g
 Oecetis kurukchetra Schmid, 1995 i c g
 Oecetis lacustris (Pictet, 1834) i c g
 Oecetis laevis Marlier, 1965 i c g
 Oecetis lais (Hagen, 1859) i c g
 Oecetis laminata (Hwang, 1957) i c g
 Oecetis lantoyae Randriamasimanana & Gibon, 1998 i c g
 Oecetis lanuginosa (McLachlan, 1875) i c g
 Oecetis laustra Mosely in Mosely & Kimmins, 1953 i c g
 Oecetis legrandi Randriamasimanana & Gibon, 1998 i c g
 Oecetis lilliput Marlier, 1965 i c g
 Oecetis lingua Schmid, 1958 i c g
 Oecetis lokapala Schmid, 1995 i c g
 Oecetis londuca Marlier, 1965 i c g
 Oecetis longiterga Kimmins, 1962 i c g
 Oecetis lucipetens Barnard, 1940 i c g
 Oecetis luenae Marlier, 1965 i c g
 Oecetis lurida Kimmins in Mosely & Kimmins, 1953 i c g
 Oecetis machadoi Marlier, 1965 i c g
 Oecetis maculata Kimmins, 1956 i c g
 Oecetis maculipennis Ulmer, 1922 i c g
 Oecetis mahadeva (Banks, 1913) i c g
 Oecetis malighawa Schmid, 1958 i c g
 Oecetis mambia Kimmins, 1962 i c g
 Oecetis marginata Kimmins, 1962 i c g
 Oecetis marojejyensis Randriamasimanana & Gibon, 1999 i c g
 Oecetis marquesi Bueno-Soria, 1981 i c g
 Oecetis maspeluda Botosaneanu, 1977 i c g
 Oecetis mbeloae Randriamasimanana & Gibon, 1998 i c g
 Oecetis meghadouta Schmid, 1958 i c g
 Oecetis mekana Kimmins, 1963 i c g
 Oecetis metlacensis Bueno-Soria, 1981 i c g
 Oecetis michaeli Malicky, 1999 i c g
 Oecetis minasata Mosely in Mosely & Kimmins, 1953 i c g
 Oecetis minuscula Yang & Morse, 2000 i c g
 Oecetis minuta Martynov, 1935 i c g
 Oecetis mirabilis Yang & Morse, 2000 i c g
 Oecetis modesta (Barnard, 1934) i c g
 Oecetis molecul  g
 Oecetis montana Ulmer, 1930 i c g
 Oecetis morii Tsuda, 1942 i c g
 Oecetis morsei Bueno-Soria, 1981 i c g
 Oecetis moureaui Marlier, 1958 i c g
 Oecetis multipunctata Ulmer, 1916 i c g
 Oecetis multispinosa Kimmins, 1963 i c g
 Oecetis narasimha Schmid, 1995 i c g
 Oecetis naravitta Schmid, 1958 i c g
 Oecetis nerviciliata (Schmid, 1958) i c g
 Oecetis nervisquamosa (Schmid, 1958) i c g
 Oecetis nigropunctata Ulmer, 1908 i c g
 Oecetis nocturna Ross, 1966 i c g
 Oecetis notata (Rambur, 1842) i c g
 Oecetis oberdorffi  g
 Oecetis obliqua Wells, 2000 i c g
 Oecetis ocellata Jacquemart, 1959 i c g
 Oecetis ochracea (Curtis, 1825) i c g
 Oecetis ochromelas Jacquemart, 1957 i c g
 Oecetis octophora Mey, 1998 i c g
 Oecetis odanis Kobayashi, 1987 i c g
 Oecetis oecetinellae Mey, 1990 i c g
 Oecetis olgae Gibon & Randriamasimanana in Randriamasimanana & Gibon, 1998 i c g
 Oecetis oliae Gibon & Randriamasimanana in Randriamasimanana & Gibon, 1999 i c g
 Oecetis oresbiosa Neboiss, 1989 i c g
 Oecetis orientalis Navas, 1921 i c g
 Oecetis ornata Kimmins, 1962 i c g
 Oecetis osteni Milne, 1934 i c g b
 Oecetis ouachita Moulton & Stewart, 1993 i c g
 Oecetis ovampoensis Barnard, 1934 i c g
 Oecetis ozarkensis Moulton & Stewart, 1993 i c g
 Oecetis panayensis Mey, 1998 i c g
 Oecetis pancharatra Schmid, 1995 i c g
 Oecetis pangana Navas, 1930 i c g
 Oecetis paracomplexa Wells, 2000 i c g
 Oecetis parallela Wells, 2000 i c g
 Oecetis paranensis Flint, 1982 i c g
 Oecetis parka Mosely in Mosely & Kimmins, 1953 i c g
 Oecetis parmata Neboiss, 1989 i c g
 Oecetis parva (Banks, 1907) i c g
 Oecetis paula (McLachlan, 1875) i c g
 Oecetis paxilla Yang & Morse, 2000 i c g
 Oecetis pechana Mosely in Mosely & Kimmins, 1953 i c g
 Oecetis pelengensis Jacquemart, 1961 i c g
 Oecetis pencillata Kimmins, 1963 i c g
 Oecetis pentafurcata Mey, 1995 i c g
 Oecetis persimilis (Banks, 1907) i c g
 Oecetis peruviana (Banks, 1924) i c g
 Oecetis peterseni Mey, 1998 i c g
 Oecetis pilakai Randriamasimanana & Gibon, 1998 i c g
 Oecetis pilosa Banks, 1937 i c g
 Oecetis piptona Neboiss, 1989 i c g
 Oecetis portalensis Mosely, 1939 i c g
 Oecetis porteri Ross, 1947 i c g
 Oecetis prahlada Schmid, 1995 i c g
 Oecetis pratelia Denning, 1948 i c g
 Oecetis pratti Denning, 1948 i c g
 Oecetis pretakalpa Schmid, 1995 i c g
 Oecetis pretiosa (Banks, 1913) i c g
 Oecetis prolixus Chen & Morce, 1992 g
 Oecetis prolongata Flint, 1981 i c g
 Oecetis pryadyumna Schmid, 1995 i c g
 Oecetis pseudoamazonica  g
 Oecetis pseudoinconspicua Bueno-Soria, 1981 i c g
 Oecetis pulchella (Banks, 1936) i c g
 Oecetis punctata (Navas, 1924) i c g
 Oecetis punctatissima (Schmid, 1958) i c g
 Oecetis punctipennis (Ulmer, 1905) i c g
 Oecetis punctulata Navás, 1932 i c g
 Oecetis purucha Schmid, 1995 i c g
 Oecetis purusamedha Schmid, 1995 i c g
 Oecetis quadrofurcata Mey, 1998 i c g
 Oecetis rafaeli Flint, 1991 i c g
 Oecetis raghava Schmid, 1995 i c g
 Oecetis rajasimha Schmid, 1995 i c g
 Oecetis rama Mosely, 1948 i c g
 Oecetis rectangula Kimmins, 1963 i c g
 Oecetis reticulata Kimmins, 1957 i c g
 Oecetis reticulatella Kimmins, 1957 i c g
 Oecetis royi Kimmins, 1961 i c g
 Oecetis rufescens Navás, 1932 i c g
 Oecetis satyagraha Schmid, 1995 i c g
 Oecetis scala Milne, 1934 i c g
 Oecetis scirpicula Neboiss, 1977 i c g
 Oecetis scoparia Flint, 1974 i c g
 Oecetis scorpius Marlier, 1965 i c g
 Oecetis scutata Ulmer, 1930 i c g
 Oecetis scutulata Martynov, 1936 i c g
 Oecetis selene Marlier, 1965 i c g
 Oecetis semissalis Yang & Morse, 2000 i c g
 Oecetis separata Banks, 1937 i c g
 Oecetis setifera Ulmer, 1922 i c g
 Oecetis sibayiensis Scott, 1968 i c g
 Oecetis sicula Yang & Morse, 2000 i c g
 Oecetis silvestris Gibbs, 1973 i c g
 Oecetis silviae Bueno-Soria, 1981 i c g
 Oecetis simplex Marlier, 1956 i c g
 Oecetis singularis (Ulmer, 1930) i c g
 Oecetis sinuata Kimmins, 1963 i c g
 Oecetis spatula Chen in Yang & Morse, 2000 i c g
 Oecetis sphyra Ross, 1941 i c g
 Oecetis spinifera Gibon & Randriamasimanana in Randriamasimanana & Gibon, 1998 i c g
 Oecetis spinosus Chen & Morce, 1992 g
 Oecetis squamosa Kimmins, 1962 i c g
 Oecetis stepheni Randriamasimanana & Gibon, 1999 i c g
 Oecetis striata (Kimmins, 1956) i c g
 Oecetis struckii Klapalek, 1903 i c g
 Oecetis submaculosa Kimmins, 1963 i c g
 Oecetis sumanasara Schmid, 1958 i c g
 Oecetis sunyani Gibbs, 1973 i c g
 Oecetis sylveri Randriamasimanana & Gibon, 1998 i c g
 Oecetis symoensi Marlier, 1981 i c g
 Oecetis taenia Yang & Morse, 2000 i c g
 Oecetis tafo Gibbs, 1973 i c g
 Oecetis tampoloensis Randriamasimanana & Gibon, 1999 i c g
 Oecetis tenuis (Martynov, 1936) i c g
 Oecetis terraesanctae (Botosaneanu & Gasith, 1971) i c g
 Oecetis testacea (Curtis, 1834) i c g
 Oecetis tetragona Marlier, 1965 i c g
 Oecetis thikanensis Mosely, 1939 i c g
 Oecetis tjonnelandi Kimmins, 1963 i c g
 Oecetis townesorum Morse, 1974 i c g
 Oecetis traini  g
 Oecetis tripunctata (Fabricius, 1793) i c g
 Oecetis tsudai Fischer, 1970 i c g
 Oecetis udayakara Schmid, 1995 i c g
 Oecetis umbra Neboiss, 1977 i c g
 Oecetis unicolor (McLachlan, 1868) i c g
 Oecetis uniforma Yang & Morse, 2000 i c g
 Oecetis upadana Schmid, 1995 i c g
 Oecetis uptoni Wells, 2000 i c g
 Oecetis uyulala Malicky & Lounaci, 1987 i c g
 Oecetis vanaprachta Schmid, 1995 i c g
 Oecetis vasugupta Schmid, 1995 i c g
 Oecetis vidhyadara Schmid, 1995 i c g
 Oecetis vijayaditya Schmid, 1995 i c g
 Oecetis vikramaditya Schmid, 1995 i c g
 Oecetis villosa Kimmins, 1963 i c g
 Oecetis virgata Ulmer, 1908 i c g
 Oecetis vrindawama Schmid, 1995 i c g
 Oecetis vulgata (Marlier, 1956) i c g
 Oecetis walpolica Neboiss, 1982 i c g
 Oecetis xaniona Neboiss, 1989 i c g
 Oecetis yogechwara Schmid, 1995 i c g
 Oecetis yukii Tsuda, 1942 i c g

Data sources: i = ITIS, c = Catalogue of Life, g = GBIF, b = Bugguide.net

References

Oecetis
Articles created by Qbugbot